People's Hospital Station, is a metro station of Line 1, Wuxi Metro. It started operations on 1 July 2014. This station will be the station of Line 5.

Exits
There are 5 exits for this station.

References

Railway stations in Jiangsu
Wuxi Metro stations
Railway stations in China opened in 2014